The 2021–22 Women's National Cricket League season was the 26th season of the Women's National Cricket League, the women's domestic limited overs cricket competition in Australia. The tournament started on 17 December 2021 and finished on 27 March 2022. Queensland were the defending champions. Tasmania won the competition, their first WNCL title, beating South Australia in the final.

Cricket Australia announced the original schedule on 21 July 2021, with the season set to begin on 23 September 2021 and the final to take place on 6 March 2022. However, on 8 September 2021, it was announced that the season start would be delayed until 16 December 2021 following the completion of WBBL/07 due to lockdowns in Sydney and Melbourne and subsequent border restrictions, with a full revised schedule to be released "in due course". The revised fixtures were released on 18 November 2021, with the season set to start with a match between Victoria and ACT Meteors on 16 December 2021 and the final date unchanged. However, on 10 December 2021, it was announced that Western Australia border closures and the need for Meteors players to self-isolate would mean further schedule changes, including the postponement of the original season opener between Victoria and the Meteors until later in the season. Further COVID-related schedule changes, including the pushing back of the final first to 18 March 2022 and subsequently 25 March 2022, were announced on 4 January 2022, 6 January 2022, 8 January 2022 and 11 February 2022.

Ladder

Fixtures
Source:

Final

Statistics

Highest totals

Most runs

Most wickets

References

Notes

Bibliography

External links
 WNCL 2021–22 on cricket.com.au
 Series home at ESPNcricinfo

Women's National Cricket League seasons
2021–22 Australian women's cricket season
Women's National Cricket League